Helen Clare Plimmer (born 3 June 1965) is an English former cricketer who played as a right-handed batter. She appeared in 9 Test matches and 37 One Day Internationals for England between 1989 and 1997, including being part of England's 1993 World Cup winning squad. She played domestic cricket for Yorkshire.

References

External links
 

1965 births
Living people
England women Test cricketers
England women One Day International cricketers
Yorkshire women cricketers